The North Territory of Baja California was a Mexican federal territory that existed from 1931 to 1952. Its former area currently comprises the northern part of the Mexican state of Baja California.  The former South Territory of Baja California, now the State of Baja California Sur, comprises the southern half.

History
In December 1930, the Mexican Congress amended Article 43 of the Constitution, thus splitting the territory of Baja California into two territories: the North Territory of Baja California and South Territory of Baja California. The border between the two was defined as the 28th parallel north.

Statehood
Beginning in 1939, several political groups that promoted the conversion of the Baja territory into a state of the Mexican Republic were created. On 15 November 1951, President Miguel Aleman Valdes sent Congress a proposed amendment to Articles 43 and 45 of the constitution to transform the North Territory of Baja California into the Free and Sovereign State of Baja California. The decree was approved on 31 December 1951 and was published in the official journal of the Federation on 16 January 1952. The last territorial governor, Alfonso García González, was appointed provisional governor of the newly created state.

Sources 
https://www.britannica.com/place/Baja-California-state-Mexico

Territories of Mexico